Hezârfen Ahmed Çelebi (1609 – 1640) was an Ottoman scientist, inventor, chemist, astronomer, physician, Andalusi musician, and poet from Constantinople (Istanbul) reported in the writings of traveler Evliya Çelebi to have achieved sustained unpowered flight.

Etymology of name
The title "Hezârfen", given by Evliyâ Çelebi to Ahmet Çelebi, is from Persian هزار hezār meaning -a thousand- + فنّ fann meaning -science together making it together Ahmet having talents in "a thousand of sciences  (polymath).

Non-powered flight

The 17th century writings of Evliyâ Çelebi relate this story of Hezârfen Ahmed Çelebi, circa 1630–1632:

While modern historians disagree with Evliya Çelebi's narration of Hezarfen flying the entire Bosporus, they state that the flight most likely was real, but heavily exaggerated, as Çelebi often exaggerates in his writings.

Legacy
One of 4 airports in Istanbul is named the "Hezarfen Airfield".
A 1996 feature-length film, "Istanbul Beneath My Wings" (İstanbul Kanatlarımın Altında) concerns the lives of Hezârfen Ahmet Çelebi, his brother and rocket aviator Lagari Hasan Çelebi, and Ottoman society in the early 17th century, as witnessed and narrated by Evliyâ Çelebi.
The Turkish children’s TV show “Little Hezarfen” (Küçük Hezarfen) is about Hezârfen Ahmet Çelebi’s childhood, though the events that occur within the show are likely fictitious and/or exaggerated. A main theme within the show, however, is Hezarfen’s desire to build wings that allow him to fly.

See also
Lagâri Hasan Çelebi

References

17th-century people from the Ottoman Empire
Unpowered flight
1609 births
1640 deaths
Turkish scientists
Scientists from the Ottoman Empire
Aviation pioneers
Glider pilots